Rome  was a department of the First French Empire in present-day Italy. It was named after the city of Rome. It was formed on 17 May 1809, when the Papal States were annexed by France, and was first known as the Département du Tibre (after the Tiber river) before being renamed on 17 February 1810. Following the conquest of the Eternal City, Napoleon gave his son the title of King of Rome.

The department was disbanded after the defeat of Napoleon in 1814. At the Congress of Vienna, the Papal States were restored to Pius VII. Its territory corresponds approximately to the modern Italian region of Lazio.

Subdivisions
The department was subdivided into the following arrondissements and cantons (situation in 1812):

 Rome; cantons: Bracciano, Civitavecchia, Frascati, Marino, Morlupo and Rome (9 cantons).
 Frosinone; cantons: Alatri, Anagni, Ceccano, Ceprano, Ferentino, Filettino, Frosinone, Guarcino, Monte San Giovanni, Prossedi, Ripi, Supino, Vallecorsa and Veroli.
 Rieti; cantons: Canemorto, Castelvecchio, Magliano, Monteleone, Narni, Poggio Mirteto, Rieti, Stroncone and Torri.
 Tivoli; cantons: Anticoli, Monterotondo, Olevano, Palestrina, Palombara, Subiaco, Tivoli, Vicovaro.
 Velletri; cantons: Albano, Cori, Genzano, Paliano, Piperno, Segni, Sermoneta, Sezze, Terracina, Valmontone and Velletri.
 Viterbo; cantons: Bagnorea, Canino, Caprarola, Civita Castellana, Corneto, Montefiascone, Orte, Ronciglione, Sant'Oreste, Soriano, Toscanella, Valentano, Vetralla, Vignanello and Viterbo.

References

Former departments of France in Italy
19th century in Rome
Rome in the Napoleonic Wars
1808 establishments in the First French Empire